Muhammad Baqir Yazdi was an Iranian mathematician who lived in the 16th century. He gave the pair of amicable numbers 9,363,584 and 9,437,056 many years before Euler's contribution to amicable numbers. He was the last notable Islamic mathematician. His major book is Oyoun Alhesab (Arabic:عيون الحساب).

References

16th-century Iranian mathematicians
Year of birth unknown
Year of death unknown